Colonial Ice Cream is a brand of ice cream manufactured by Colonial Ice Cream, Inc, St. Charles, IL.

Colonial is a descendant of a dairy business founded in 1901 by Simon Anderson of St. Charles.  The early dairy supplied milk and ice cream to drug stores, restaurants, and grocery stores, and began its own retail outlets in 1935.  The dairy portion of the business was sold in 1945, but the family continued the ice cream business and began opening restaurants in 1957.  The company, which now operates two restaurants in the Fox Valley, Illinois, area is still in the hands of the Anderson family.

References

External links
Company page

Food and drink companies established in 1901
Ice cream brands
Companies based in Kane County, Illinois
1901 establishments in Illinois